Unida Christian Colleges is a Christian academic institution located in Anabu 1 F, Imus, Cavite, Philippines.  The institute currently offers Pre-Elementary, Grade School, High School, and College.

History 
It was founded in 1966 by the late Bishop Serafin E. Ruperto, former pastor of Anabu Iglesia Evangelica Unida de Cristo, which is presently known as Anabu Unida Church.

In 1996, the institution embarked its elementary department and changed its name to Pag-ibig Unida School, Inc.  The program was further expanded by commencing high school education in 1999 through the leadership of its then chairman of the Board of Trustees, Atty. Guillermo A. Ramos.  In 2002, the school sensed the need of a college institution in the community and decided to expand its boarders by offering college courses through the establishment of the Unida Evangelical Colleges, Inc.  Under the leadership of its current chairman of the Board of Trustees, Jayson R. Sardido, these two institutions were finally merged in January 2008 to better serve its community and Unida Christian Colleges, Inc. (UCC) was born.

Courses Offered 

Complete Basic Education

K to 12

College Courses
 Bachelor of Science in Business Administration (BSBA) major in Operations Management
 Bachelor of Elementary Education (BEEd)
 Bachelor of Secondary Education (BSE) major in English
 Bachelor of Science in Computer Science (BSCS)
 Associate in Computer Technology (ACT)

Education in Imus
Educational institutions established in 1966
High schools in Cavite
Protestant schools in the Philippines
Universities and colleges in Cavite
1966 establishments in the Philippines